SAMAS may refer to:

 Società Albese Meccanica Speciali, a defunct Italian auto manufacturer
 Strategic Armor Military Assault Suit in Rifts (role-playing game)